The Roman Catholic Archdiocese of Sherbrooke is a Roman Catholic archdiocese that includes part of the civil province of Quebec and includes the suffragan dioceses of Nicolet and Saint-Hyacinthe. It is currently led by Luc Cyr.

As of 2004, the archdiocese contains 107 parishes, 195 active diocesan priests, 107 religious priests, and 291,000 Catholics.  It also has 1,012 women religious, 197 religious brothers, and 18 permanent deacons.

History
By 1830, Irish and French Canadian Catholics in the area worshipped at a small chapel dedicated to St. Columban.  In 1874, the Diocese of Sherbrooke was created from the Roman Catholic Archdiocese of Quebec. Antoine Racine was appointed the first bishop. The following year, Racine founded the Séminaire Saint-Charles-Borromée, taught he theology for a number of years.

Bishops

Diocesan bishops
The following is a list of the bishops and archbishops of Sherbrooke and their terms of service:
Antoine Racine (1874–1893)
Paul LaRocque (1893–1926)
Alphonse-Osias Gagnon (1927–1941)
Philippe Desranleau (1941–1952)
Georges Cabana (1952–1967)
Jean-Marie Fortier (1968–1996)
André Gaumond (1996–2011)
Luc Cyr (2011–present)

Coadjutor bishops
 Georges Cabana (1952)
 André Gaumond (1995-1996)

Auxiliary bishop
 Alphonse-Osias Gagnon (1923-1927), appointed Bishop here

Other priests of this diocese who became bishops
 Donald Lapointe, appointed Auxiliary Bishop of Saint-Jérôme, Québec in 2002
 Daniel Jodoin, appointed Bishop of Bathurst in Canada, New Brunswick in 2013
Joseph Ferdinand Guy Boulanger, appointed Bishop of Rouyn-Noranda, Québec in 2020

References

External links
Archdiocese of Sherbrooke page at catholichierarchy.org retrieved July 14, 2006

 
Catholic Church in Quebec
Organizations based in Sherbrooke